Qorban Kandi (also Romanized as Qorbān Kandī) is a village in Almalu Rural District, Nazarkahrizi District, Hashtrud County, East Azerbaijan Province, Iran. At the 2006 census, its population was 20, in 4 families.

References 

Towns and villages in Hashtrud County